Andreas Düben (1597 – 7 July 1662) was a Swedish Baroque composer and organist, and father of Gustaf Düben. He was born near Leipzig and was admitted to Leipzig University in 1609. He studied with the renowned Dutch pedagogue Jan Pieterszoon Sweelinck from 1614 until 1620 when he secured a position as organist in the Swedish court orchestra in Stockholm. He was appointed conductor of that same group in 1640. In addition to his activities at court, he served as organist of the German Church (from 1625), and Storkyrkan (from 1649/50). His assistant at the German Church was Wilhelm Karges. His surviving works include two choral works, a number of instrumental dances, and a handful of organ works.

References

1597 births
1662 deaths
17th-century classical composers
17th-century Swedish musicians
Swedish Baroque composers
Swedish classical composers
Swedish male classical composers
Swedish people of German descent
17th-century male musicians
Andreas